Dhahi Khalfan Tamim (born 1 October 1951) is a Lieutenant General and the current Deputy Chief of Police and General Security. He was chief of the Dubai Police Force until the end of the 2013, which is when Khamis Al-Mazeina (died 2016) took over. He came to international attention while overseeing the investigation of the group suspected of the assassination of Mahmoud al-Mabhouh.

Biography 
Tamim was born in Dubai on 1 October 1951. He attended the Royal Police College in Amman, Jordan in 1970. He worked as a criminal investigator.
He was also in charge of receiving and test driving a new electric police vehicle in 2013.

Positions 
 Head of Financial and Administrative Affairs
 Deputy Chief of Police and General Security (2013 - Present)
 Chief of Dubai Police (1980)
 Member of Dubai Executive committee

Controversies

He is known for speaking his mind and beyond.  In 2017, he made some comments about different nationalities/races which could contravene Dubai's law and could land him in hot water.  

, Pravda online accused the UAE of adopting " policies against Jews" when, on 1 March of that year, Tamim allegedly said that "anyone who looks or sounds like a citizen of Israel will be blocked from entering the country, even if a suspected individual produces a passport of a different state". Pravda responded by asking the rhetorical question: "Will Emirates liken itself to the Third Reich and use rulers and protractors to measure the shape of the nose, earlaps and the skull structure? If it does, the UAE will lose all of its friends in the West".

He has received criticism for stating that he would alert Israeli authorities if he learned of a planned terrorist attack on their soil. Furthermore, in July 2013, he received criticism for contesting the notion that Israel was the enemy of Arabs by declaring that the Muslim Brotherhood pose a significantly more substantial threat.

He is a major critic of Qatar's support of the Muslim Brotherhood. This caused already-strained relations between Emirates and Qatar to further deteriorate. He also launched a verbal attack against Kuwait in March 2014, accusing Kuwait of "destroying Iraq".

In 2015, he was publicly rebuked by Emirati minister of foreign affairs Abdullah bin Zayed on Twitter as a result of expressing support for former Yemeni president Ali Abdullah Saleh. He also criticised the tactics employed by coalition forces during the 2015 intervention in Yemen.

In February 2017, he praised United States President Donald Trump's ban on individuals from seven Muslim-majority countries. 

In October 2017, Dhahi Khalfan wrote about the Qatar diplomatic crisis on Twitter in Arabic; "If the World Cup leaves Qatar, Qatar’s crisis will be over … because the crisis is created to get away from it". According to observers, the message appeared to imply that the blockade was enacted due to Qatar hosting the world's biggest football event. In reaction to media coverage of his tweet, Dhahi Khalfan tweeted; “I said Qatar is faking a crisis and claims it’s besieged so it could get away from the burdens of building expensive sports facilities for the World Cup” UAE Minister of State for Foreign Affairs Anwar Gargash said Dhahi Khalfan had been misunderstood in media coverage. In response, Gargash clarified that Qatar's hosting of World Cup 2022 "should include a repudiation of policies supporting extremism & terrorism."

After hundreds of civilians were killed in the November 2017 Sinai mosque attack by ISIL, he blamed the attack on Qatari news network Al Jazeera and suggested that Egypt should "bomb" the network in retaliation.

On April 3, 2018 he tweeted "Why Indians are disciplined? While sedition, criminality and smuggling in the Pakistani community are rampant" he also mentioned that the Pakistanis pose a serious threat to the Gulf communities because they bring drugs to their countries and that the Indians are more disciplined than the Pakistanis. His comments came after Dubai authorities arrested gang of Pakistanis involved in smuggling drugs. He had also made comments like this before.

See also 
 Dubai
 Dubai Police Force

References

External links 

 Dubai Police Official Website
 Government of Dubai Official Website

Emirati police officers
Living people
1951 births